Henry Deacon may refer to:

 Henry Deacon (Eureka), a character in the American science fiction series Eureka
 Henry Deacon (cricketer) (1809–1854), English cricketer
 Henry Deacon (industrialist) (1822–1876), founded a chemical business in Widnes, England